Iron Maiden are an English heavy metal band formed by bassist Steve Harris in 1975. The band's first album, 1980's Iron Maiden, was written primarily by Harris, with vocalist Paul Di'Anno co-writing two tracks and guitarist Dave Murray contributing "Charlotte the Harlot". The 1981 follow-up, Killers, was written almost entirely by the bassist, with frontman Di'Anno contributing only to the title track, "Killers" (the North American bonus track "Twilight Zone" was credited to Harris and Murray). Bruce Dickinson replaced Di'Anno after the release of Killers, although he did not contribute any songwriting to The Number of the Beast, released in 1982, which featured three songs co-written by guitarist Adrian Smith, and one co-written by drummer Clive Burr (a B-side also co written by Burr was included in a 1990s re-release of the album). The Number of the Beast also spawned Iron Maiden's first UK Singles Chart top ten in the form of "Run to the Hills", which charted at number seven on its release. It was not until 1983's Piece of Mind that the songwriting process became a more varied and collaborative approach, with just four of its nine tracks being credited solely to Harris, two to Dickinson and Smith, one to Harris and Murray, one to Dickinson alone, and one to Harris, Dickinson, and Smith. The Dickinson and Smith-penned "Flight of Icarus" was the first Iron Maiden single to chart in the United States, reaching number eight on the Billboard Mainstream Rock chart.

Powerslave followed in 1984, which featured one of Iron Maiden's longest songs to date in the form of "Rime of the Ancient Mariner", written by Steve Harris and running for almost 14 minutes. Somewhere in Time was notable for having both its singles written by someone other than Steve Harris, in this case Adrian Smith, who wrote three of the songs on the album. Seventh Son of a Seventh Son featured songwriting from a combination of Harris, Dickinson, Smith, and Murray, before Smith left the group during the recording of its follow-up in 1990 having contributed to one song, "Hooks in You"; the resulting album, No Prayer for the Dying, was the first to feature guitarist Janick Gers, although he did not write any material for the record. It was also the first to spawn a UK number-one single – Bruce Dickinson's "Bring Your Daughter... to the Slaughter". Gers contributed to his second album with Iron Maiden, 1992's Fear of the Dark, co-writing three tracks with Dickinson, who would leave after the album's release, and two with Harris, who also produced for the first time.

In 1995, the band released The X Factor, their first album since 1981's Killers without Bruce Dickinson on vocals. Blaze Bayley replaced the frontman, and received songwriting credits for five of the album's eleven tracks, all of which were alongside Harris, Gers, or both. The band's first compilation album, Best of the Beast, was released in 1996, which featured a new song and single in the form of "Virus", credited to Harris, Bayley, Murray, and Gers. Bayley recorded a second album with Iron Maiden, Virtual XI, on which he only contributed songwriting for three songs, the rest being written almost entirely by Harris.

Both Dickinson and Smith returned to the band for the recording of Brave New World, the first Iron Maiden album produced by Kevin Shirley (alongside Harris), which was released in 2000 and spawned two UK top-20 singles in the form of "The Wicker Man" and "Out of the Silent Planet". Another largely collaborative album, only one song ("Blood Brothers") was written by Harris alone. The 2003 follow-up, Dance of Death, was even more commercially successful than Brave New World, and also featured the first track in the band's history to be written with long-term drummer Nicko McBrain, "New Frontier". A Matter of Life and Death, the band's first release to chart in the top ten of the US Billboard 200 albums chart, was released in 2006 and was largely written by Harris, Dickinson, and Smith, with Gers and Murray also contributing to a couple of tracks. The Final Frontier, released in 2010, was their first album since Fear of the Dark to top the UK Albums Chart and was another collaborative effort from the band, with Harris, Dickinson, and Smith again leading the songwriting. The Final Frontier also led to the band's first Grammy Award win, as single "El Dorado" won the award for Best Metal Performance at the 2011 ceremony. Their 2015 studio album, The Book of Souls, is their longest to date, at 92 minutes, and their first double album. It features "Empire of the Clouds", written by Dickinson, which surpasses "Rime of the Ancient Mariner" as the band's longest song, with a running time of 18 minutes.

Since their formation, Iron Maiden have also released numerous additional songs as B-sides to their singles, including original songs and cover versions. A collection of these B-sides were compiled and released in the form of Best of the 'B' Sides, one of three albums included in the Eddie's Archive box set released in 2002. Included on this album was a range of B-sides released since the band's formation, including originals "Burning Ambition" (Harris), "Black Bart Blues" (Harris, Dickinson), and "Justice of the Peace" (Harris, Murray), and covers "Cross-Eyed Mary" (Jethro Tull), "Communication Breakdown" (Led Zeppelin), and "My Generation" (The Who). The album also contained 1988 re-recordings of Iron Maiden tracks "Prowler" and "Charlotte the Harlot", released as B-sides to "The Evil That Men Do", and a 1999 live version of "Wasted Years" from the 1986 album Somewhere in Time, released as a B-side to "Out of the Silent Planet" in 2000. Iron Maiden also contributed a cover of Deep Purple's "Space Truckin'" to the 2012 tribute album Re-Machined: A Tribute to Deep Purple's Machine Head.

Songs

Notes

See also
Iron Maiden discography

References

External links
List of Iron Maiden songs at AllMusic
Iron Maiden official website

Iron Maiden